The word Musta'arabim (from ) may refer to:

the Musta'arabi Jews, the Jews of the Arab world who were culturally and linguistically Arabized.
the Mozarabs, Christian Spaniards in Arab Muslim ruled Spain who were culturally and linguistically Arabized.